Latifi's dwarf gecko (Microgecko latifi), also known commonly as the Zagros tiny gecko, is a species of lizard in the family Gekkonidae. The species is endemic to Iran.

Etymology
The specific name, latifi, is in honor of Iranian herpetologist Mahmoud Latifi.

Geographic range
M. latifi is found in the Zagros Mountains in Iran in the provinces of Fars, Kerman, and Markazi.

Reproduction
M. latifi is oviparous.

References

Further reading
Bauer, Aaron M.; Masroor, Rafaqat; Titus-McQuillan, James; Heinicke, Matthew P.; Daza, Juan D.; Jackman, Todd R. (2013). "A preliminary phylogeny of the Palearctic naked-toed geckos (Reptilia: Squamata: Gekkonidae) with taxonomic implications". Zootaxa 3599 (4): 301–324.
Leviton, Alan E.; Anderson, Steven C. (1972). "Description of a new species of Tropiocolotes (Reptilia: Gekkonidae) with a revised key to the genus". Occasional Papers of the California Academy of Sciences (96): 1–7. (Tropiocolotes latifi, new species).

Microgecko
Reptiles described in 1972
Reptiles of Iran